Jones Chapel may refer to:

Jones Chapel, Alabama, a community
Jones Chapel (New York City), a church